The Libertarian Party of New Mexico (LPNM) is a libertarian political party in New Mexico. It was affiliated with the national Libertarian Party from its founding until 2022, and is now affiliated with the Association of Liberty State Parties.

Before 2022, it was a state affiliate of the Libertarian Party from the party's founding in 1972. Since 2016, it has been qualified as a major party in New Mexico. In 2018, it became the first Libertarian Party affiliate to have a statewide officeholder when Public Lands Commissioner Aubrey Dunn Jr. switched his partisan affiliation from Republican to Libertarian.

History

1970s

On June 27, 1972, the Libertarian Party of New Mexico filed its articles of incorporation with the New Mexico Corporation Commission. Diana Amsden, Maurice McDonald, and Sidney Light were listed as the original directors. On July 22, the party held its first state convention where seven people were selected to serve on its executive committee and a political platform was approved.

On September 1, 1978, Bob Walsh filed a lawsuit in the U.S. District Court against County Clerk Emma C. Gonzales so that he could be placed onto the ballot for the New Mexico House of Representatives from the 22nd district. Assistant County Attorney John J. Carmody Jr. had advised Gonzales not to place Walsh onto the ballot as New Mexico law required political parties to file their party rules with the county clerk within thirty days after the party organization was formed, which the Libertarians did not do, and that the Libertarian Party did not have a process for nominating legislative office candidates in single county districts. On September 8, District Judge Phillip Baiamonte ruled against Walsh. Walsh appealed to the New Mexico Supreme Court, but the Supreme Court ruled against him.

1980s

In 1983, Senate Bill 352, which would reduce the required number of signatures to appear on the election ballot from 3% of the total votes cast in the most recent presidential or gubernatorial election to 1% of the total votes cast in the most recent presidential or gubernatorial election, was introduced at the request of the Libertarian Party of New Mexico. The legislation passed in the New Mexico Senate and New Mexico House of Representatives. On April 7, Governor Toney Anaya signed the legislation into law.

2010s

In 2016, the Libertarian presidential nominee, former New Mexico Governor Gary Johnson, received over 9% of the popular vote in the presidential election in New Mexico. By receiving over 5% of the popular vote in a statewide election Johnson gave the party major party status in New Mexico.

In January 2018, Aubrey Dunn Jr., the New Mexico Commissioner of Public Lands, announced that he had switched his party affiliation from Republican to Libertarian. Dunn was the first statewide official in the United States to be a member of the Libertarian Party.

During the 2018 gubernatorial election Bob Walsh filed to run as the party's gubernatorial nominee and Robin Dunn as the lieutenant gubernatorial nominee. However, both filed after the deadline forcing them to run as write-in candidates to appear on the general election ballot. In the primary both failed to receive enough write-in votes to appear on the general election ballot. The party maintained its major party status after receiving over 5% of the popular vote in the land commissioner and secretary of state elections.

2020s
The LPNM will have a gubernatorial candidate in the 2022 election which is the first time that the party will have a gubernatorial candidate appear on the ballot. 

On August 25, 2022, citing alleged interference by the Libertarian National Committee into state party affairs, the party terminated its affiliation with the national Libertarian Party. It affiliated with the Association of Liberty State Parties later that year.

Elected officials
 Laura Burrows, University of New Mexico–Los Alamos Advisory Board
 Veronica Rodriguez, Anthony Water & Sanitation Board
 Kene Lane Terry, Logan School District board member
 Max Tenorio Jr., Luna Community College board member
 Robin L. Dunn,  Soil & Water Supervisor 1, Claunch Pinto Soil & Water Conservation Board

Election results

Presidential

United States Senate

Statewide elections

See also
 List of state parties of the Libertarian Party (United States)

References

External links
 

New Mexico
Political parties in New Mexico